Byron Black and Jonathan Stark were the defending champions, but Black did not compete this year. Stark teamed up with Todd Martin and lost in the quarterfinals to Mark Knowles and Daniel Nestor.

Jared Palmer and Richey Reneberg won the title by defeating Tommy Ho and Brett Steven 4–6, 7–6, 6–1 in the final.

Seeds
All seeds received a bye into the second round.

Draw

Finals

Top half

Bottom half

References

External links
 Official results archive (ATP)
 Official results archive (ITF)

U.S. National Indoor Championships
Singles